Clore Plow Works-J.W. Whitlock and Company  are two historic industrial buildings located at Rising Sun, Ohio County, Indiana.  The main building consists of six interconnected buildings: the Whitlock Office (c. 1914), Whitlock Garage (c. 1914), Clore Wood Shop (c. 1900), Clore Machine Shop (c. 1900), the Forge (c. 1900), and the Engine Room (c. 1900). Also on the property is the Paint Shed (c. 1900).  The Ohio County Historical Society has occupied the buildings since 1969.

It was listed on the National Register of Historic Places in 1999.  The buildings are located in the Rising Sun Historic District.

References

External links
Ohio County Historical Society website

History museums in Indiana
Industrial buildings and structures on the National Register of Historic Places in Indiana
Industrial buildings completed in 1914
Buildings and structures in Ohio County, Indiana
National Register of Historic Places in Ohio County, Indiana
Historic district contributing properties in Indiana